The 2017 season was Sarawak's 13th season in club history and 5th season in the Liga Super since being promoted in 2014.

Season Summary
After few seasons battle with bottom half finished, Bujang Senang finally bid farewell to the top flight after relegated. Bottom teams fate need to be decided until final day of the season. Kelantan did the great escape by winning 3–1 in Melaka thus secured 3 points to avoid relegation, meanwhilst Sarawak goalless draw with T Team saw the team down to Liga Perdana next term. Due to new rules and regulation regarding the FAM & AFC license requirement, Sarawak and Penang alongside Felda United and T-Team altogether 4 teams relegated to premier league for 2018.

Which saw Negeri Sembilan and PKNP promoted to 2018 super league replacing demoted T-team and Felda united. After Kuala Lumpur and Terengganu advanced as 2017 premier league winners and runners up. By following the AFC, FAM rules and condition Terengganu and T Team later rebrand as Terengganu FC II are disallowed to compete in same league/division since they acted as reserve team/feeder team to Terengganu FC I. The same law applied to JDT I and JDT II where they need to plays in different division to avoid matchfixing or conflict of interest.

Sarawak had bright campaign in FA Cup by trashing Misc Mifa 6–3 in second round, beating Perlis 2–1 in away fixture before drawn with Terengganu in quarterfinal, which saw them tied 2–2 on aggregate, only to be separated by penalty shoot out 4–1 win to the east coast team which saw Terengganu advanced to semi final against Kedah, eventual winner.

Dismal draw in Malaysia cup when Sarawak had to face 2 giants, JDT and Selangor, against with Terengganu in a group stage. Ngap sayot finished the group as expected in 3rd position with later winner, JDT and Selangor advanced to the next round.

Highlight of the season
Sarawak welcoming the arrival of Demerson Bruno, the survival of Chapecoense team that scheduled to play in Copa Sudamericana final unfortunately involved in air disaster. Mark Hartmann also scored a wonderful goal against Misc Mifa during FA cup match that resemble to Papiss Cisse wonder goal against Chelsea in 2012, local crowd nominated that goal for Puskas Award but nothing further action were taken. Thus denying second consecutive time for Malaysia to win the award after Faiz Subri achievement.

Background information
Sarawak had their eyes on a promising season with transfers such as Mateo Roskam and Demerson coming to help aid them in reaching the top half of the table after the previous season's unimpressive 8th-place ranking.

Competitions

Overview

Liga Super

League table

Matches

Source: Fixtures / Result

FA Cup 

Knock-out stage

Quarter-finals

Malaysia Cup

Group stage

Statistics

Appearances
Correct as of match played on 28 October 2017

Top scorers
Correct as of match played on 28 October 2017
The list is sorted by shirt number when total goals are equal.

* Player names in bold denotes player that left mid-season

Clean sheets
Correct as of match played on 28 October 2017
The list is sorted by shirt number when total clean sheets are equal.

Transfers
First transfer window started in December 2017  to 22 January 2017 and second transfer window will started on 15 May 2017 to 11 June 2017.

In

First window

Second window

Out

First window

Second window

References

Sarawak FA seasons
Malaysian football clubs 2017 season